Henri Vidal (born May 4, 1864 in Charenton, died in 1918 in Le Cannet) was a French sculptor known for his 1896 sculpture, Caïn venant de tuer son frère Abel (Cain, after having murdered his brother Abel) which is in the Tuileries Garden in Paris. Vidal was a student of Mathurin Moreau.

Honours and awards
At the  he was awarded
In 1884, an honorable mention;
In 1890, a medal in the 3rd class;
In 1892, the Salon prize awarded by the Superior Council of Fine Arts;
In 1892, a medal in the 2nd class and
In 1900, a medal in the 1st class.

At the 1900 Paris Exposition he won a silver medal.

References

External links

Cain - Paris, France

1864 births
1918 deaths
19th-century French sculptors
20th-century French sculptors
French male sculptors
19th-century French male artists